Portrait of Henry VIII is a lost work by Hans Holbein the Younger depicting Henry VIII. It was destroyed by fire in 1698, but is still well known through many copies. It is one of the most iconic images of Henry and is one of the most famous portraits of any English or British monarch. It was created in 1536–1537 as part of a mural showing the Tudor dynasty at the Palace of Whitehall, Westminster.

Description
Hans Holbein the Younger, originally from Germany, had been appointed the English King's Painter in 1536. The portrait was created to adorn the privy chamber of Henry's newly acquired Palace of Whitehall. Henry was spending vast sums to decorate the  warren of residences he had seized after the downfall of Cardinal Wolsey. The original mural featured four figures arranged around a marble plinth: Henry, his wife Jane Seymour, and his parents, Henry VII and Elizabeth of York. The mural was thus commissioned sometime during the brief marriage of Henry and Jane Seymour, and was completed in 1537. It may well have been commissioned to celebrate the coming or actual birth of Henry's long-awaited heir, Edward, born in October 1537. It is not clear where in the palace the mural was located, but it may have been in the king's Privy Chamber or study, where only a very select few would have seen it.

Henry is posed without any of the standard royal accoutrements such as a sword, crown, or sceptre. This was common in progressive royal portraiture of the period, for example the portraits by Titian of the Habsburg family and other royalty, and also French and German royal portraits.  But Holbein's success in conveying royal majesty without such specific props is exceptional.  The majestic presence is conveyed through Henry's aggressive posture, standing proudly erect, directly facing the viewer. His legs are spread apart and arms held from his side in the pose of a warrior or a wrestler. In one hand he holds a glove, while the other reaches towards an ornate dagger hanging at his waist. Henry's clothes and surroundings are ornate, with the original painting using gold leaf to highlight the opulence. The detailed blackwork embroidery is especially notable. He wears an array of jewellery including several large rings and a pair of necklaces. His large codpiece and heavily padded shoulders further enhance the aggressive masculinity of the image.

The portrait has been called a work of propaganda, designed to enhance Henry's majesty. It deliberately skews his figure to make him more imposing. Comparisons of surviving sets of Henry's armour show that his legs were much shorter in reality than in the painting. The painting also shows Henry as young and full of health, when in truth he was in his forties and had been badly injured earlier in the year in a tiltyard accident. He was also already suffering from the health problems that would affect the latter part of his life. 

Henry recognized the power of the image Holbein created, and encouraged other artists to copy the painting and distributed the various versions around the realm, giving them as gifts to friends and ambassadors. Major nobles would commission their own copies of the painting to show their loyalty to Henry. The many copies made of the portrait explain why it has become such an iconic image, even after the destruction of the original when Whitehall Palace was consumed by fire in 1698. It has had a lasting effect on Henry's public image. For instance Charles Laughton's Oscar-winning performance in The Private Life of Henry VIII was modelled after the swaggering Henry depicted by Holbein.

Surviving images
A full-size cartoon done by Holbein in preparation for the portrait group survives in the collection of the National Portrait Gallery, showing only the left-hand third of the group, with the two Henries.  This was used to make an outline of the design on the wall, by pricking holes along the main lines and pushing powdered soot through. The cartoon differs slightly from the final version. Most notably it shows Henry standing in a more traditional three-quarters view rather than the final and iconic head-on position. 

Also surviving is a much smaller half-length portrait of Henry by Holbein that is today in the collection of the Thyssen-Bornemisza Museum in Madrid. This, the only surviving painting of Henry from Holbein's hand, may also have been a preparatory study. In it Henry wears much the same clothing as the final mural, but is still posed in a three-quarters view. For many years this painting was owned by the Spencer family and housed at Althorp. Financial problems forced the 7th Earl Spencer to sell much of the art collection, and it was purchased by Heinrich Thyssen.

All the remaining copies of the painting are today attributed to other artists, though in most cases the name of the copyist is unknown. They vary dramatically in their quality and faithfulness to the original source. Most of the reproductions only copy the image of Henry, though a copy by Remigius van Leemput of the entire mural is in the Royal Collection, usually on display at Hampton Court Palace.  This was made in 1667 for Charles II. The highest quality, and best known, copy is that currently in the collection of the Walker Art Gallery (illustration), which may have been commissioned by Edward Seymour, Jane's brother.

See also
List of paintings by Hans Holbein the Younger
Cultural depictions of Henry VIII of England

References

Henry VIII
Cultural depictions of Henry VIII
1530s paintings
Henry VIII
Henry VIII
1530s in England
Collections of the Art Gallery of Ontario
Paintings in the Royal Collection of the United Kingdom
Paintings in the collection of the Walker Art Gallery